Senator Youngblood may refer to:

Edward Youngblood (born 1939), Maine State Senate
Francis M. Youngblood (1835–1907), Illinois State Senate